The Luitpoldings were a medieval dynasty which ruled the German stem duchy of Bavaria from some time in the late ninth century off and on until 985.

Origins
The descent of the East Frankish Luitpoldings has not been conclusively established. The progenitor of the family, Margrave Luitpold of Bavaria, possibly was a relative of the early medieval Huosi noble family and maybe related to the Imperial Carolingian dynasty by Emperor Arnulf's mother, Liutswind. In 893 Arnulf appointed Luitpold margrave in Carinthia and Pannonia, succeeding the Wilhelminer margrave Engelschalk II. Luitpold was able to enlarge his Bavarian possessions around Regensburg and in the adjacent March of the Nordgau, he became a military leader during the Hungarian invasions and was killed in the 907 Battle of Pressburg. 

While the Kingdom of Germany emerged under the rule King Conrad I and his successors of the royal Ottonian dynasty, Luitpold's son and heir Arnulf the Bad, backed by the local nobility, adopted the Bavarian ducal title, reorganised the defence against the Hungarian invaders and, according to the contemporary Annales iuvavenses, built up a king-like position at his Regensburg residence. He inevitably interfered with the Ottonian King Henry I of Germany, whose rule he finally acknowledged in 921, reserving numerous privileges for himself. Given a free hand, he campaigned in the lands of the Přemyslid duke Wenceslaus of Bohemia and in 933/34 even invaded the Kingdom of Italy, in order to obtain the Iron Crown of Lombardy for his son Eberhard, though without success.

Decline
Eberhard had succeeded his father as Duke of Bavaria in 937, however, he soon struggled with King Otto I of Germany, who had no intention to respect the Bavarian autonomy. Otto declared Eberhard deposed and banned the next year and instead appointed Arnulf's brother Berthold duke, after he had renounced the exercise of the Bavarian liberties.

Berthold remained a loyal supporter of King Otto, nevertheless upon his death in 947 the hereditary title of his son Henry the Younger was denied, when the king ceded the Bavarian duchy to his own brother Henry I, who had married Arnulf's daughter Judith. In 976 Henry the Younger received a certain compensation from Emperor Otto II with the newly established Duchy of Carinthia. In 983 he even regained the Bavarian ducal title, however, two years later he had to yield the force of the Ottonian Duke Henry the Wrangler. With his death in 989, the Luitpoldings became extinct.

Genealogy
Luitpold (d. 907), Margrave of Carinthia and Upper Pannonia, Count in the Nordgau
Arnulf the Bad, Duke of Bavaria from 907 to 937, had to accept the overlordship of King Henry the Fowler in 921
Eberhard, Duke of Bavaria from 937 to 938, deposed and banned by King Otto I of Germany
Arnulf II (913954), Bavarian Count palatine from 938
Berthold of Reisensburg (930999), Bavarian Count Palatine
Judith, Duchess of Bavaria (925985), married Henry I, younger brother of King Otto I, Duke of Lotharingia 939940, Duke of Bavaria from 948 until his death in 955
Berthold, Duke of Bavaria upon the deposition of his nephew Eberhard in 938 until his death in 947
Henry the Younger, Duke of Carinthia 976978 and 985989, Duke of Bavaria from 983 to 985

An affiliation with the Bavarian House of Wittelsbach is possible though not proven: Count palatine Arnulf II about 940 had a castle built at Scheyern; the descendants of Count Otto I of Scheyern (d. before 4 December 1072), documented as Vogt of Freising in 1047, are rated as ancestors of the Wittelsbachs.

 
Noble families of the Holy Roman Empire